Liberal conservatism is a political ideology combining conservative policies with liberal stances, especially on economic issues but also on social and ethical matters, representing a brand of political conservatism strongly influenced by liberalism.

The ideology incorporates the classical liberal view of minimal government intervention in the economy, according to which individuals should be free to participate in the market and generate wealth without government interference. However, liberal conservatives also hold that individuals cannot be thoroughly depended on to act responsibly in other spheres of life; therefore, they believe that a strong state is necessary to ensure law and order and that social institutions are needed to nurture a sense of duty and responsibility to the nation. Liberal conservatives also support civil liberties, along with some socially conservative positions. They differ on social issues with some being more socially conservative while others taking a more liberal approach, though generally supporting the rule of law regarding civil rights, social equality and the environment. This is equated with the creation of a cohesive and tolerant society with increased levels of individual responsibility and less inequality.

Liberal conservatism shares the classical liberal tenets of a commitment to individualism, belief in negative freedom, a lightly regulated free market, and a minimal rule of law state. A number of commentators have stated that many conservative currents in the 1980s, such as Thatcherism, were rejuvenated classical liberals in all but name. However, in contrast to classical liberalism there is a stronger social agenda and support for a greater degree of state intervention especially in certain areas of social life which liberal conservatives believe should not be subject to market forces. Particularly in regards to the family, sexuality, health and education, these should either always be periodically regulated or minimally protected by the state.

In Europe, liberal conservatism is the dominant form of modern conservatism and centre-right politics. Most European liberal-conservative parties adhere to the European People's Party, originally formed by Christian democrats.

Overview, definitions and usage 
Both conservatism and liberalism have had different meanings over time in different centuries. The term liberal conservatism has been used in quite different ways. It usually contrasts with aristocratic conservatism, which deems the principle of equality as something discordant with human nature and emphasizes instead the idea of natural inequality. As conservatives in democratic countries have embraced typical liberal institutions such as the rule of law, private property, the market economy and constitutional representative government, the liberal element of liberal conservatism became consensual among conservatives. In some countries such as the United Kingdom and the United States, the term liberal conservatism came to be understood simply as conservatism in popular culture, prompting some conservatives who embraced more strongly classical-liberal values to call themselves libertarians instead. However, there are differences between classical liberals and libertarians.

In their embracement of liberal and free market principles, European liberal conservatives are clearly distinguishable from those holding national-conservative, fully socially conservative and/or outright populist views, let alone a right-wing populist posture. Being liberal often involves stressing free market economics and the belief in individual responsibility together with the defense of civil rights and support for a limited welfare state. Compared to other centre-right political traditions such as Christian democracy, liberal conservatives are less socially conservative and more economically liberal, favouring low taxes and minimal state intervention in the economy. Some regional varieties and peculiarities can be observed:
 In much of Central and Northwestern Europe, especially in Germanic and traditionally Protestant countries as well as the United Kingdom and Belgium, a divide persists between liberal conservatives (including Christian democrats) and liberals (including conservative liberals and social liberals).
 In most Nordic countries, liberal conservatives, Christian democrats and liberals form distinct political families and have each their own party. The largest liberal parties are the Nordic agrarian parties, which are traditionally agrarian.
 In most countries where Romance languages are spoken and where Catholicism is or has been dominant as well as in Greece and Poland, liberal conservative movements, often encompassing Christian democrats and liberals,  have more recently gained traction and the terms conservative and liberal may be understood as synonymous.

At the European level, Christian democrats and most liberal conservatives are affiliated to the European People's Party (EPP), while liberals (including conservative and social liberals) to the Alliance of Liberals and Democrats for Europe Party (ALDE Party). In this context, some traditionally Christian-democratic parties (such as Christian-Democratic and Flemish in Belgium, the Christian Democratic Appeal in the Netherlands, the Christian Democratic Union in Germany and the People's Party in Austria) have become almost undistinguishable from other liberal-conservative parties. On the other hand, newer liberal-conservative parties (such as New Democracy in Greece, the Social Democratic Party in Portugal, the People's Party in Spain, Forza Italia/The People of Freedom/Forza Italia in Italy, the Union for a Popular Movement/The Republicans in France and most centre-right parties from countries once belonging to the Eastern Bloc and Yugoslavia) have not adopted traditional labels, but their ideologies are also a mixture of conservatism, Christian democracy and liberalism.

In the modern European discourse, liberal conservatism usually encompasses centre-right political outlooks that reject at least to some extent social conservatism. This position is also associated with support for moderate forms of social safety net and environmentalism (see also green conservatism and green liberalism). This variety of liberal conservatism has been espoused by Nordic conservatives (the Moderate Party in Sweden, the Conservative Party in Norway and the National Coalition Party in Finland) which have been fending off competition from right-wing populists to their right and do not include Christian democrats; and at times the British Conservative Party. In an interview shortly after taking office as Prime Minister in 2010, David Cameron introduced himself as a liberal conservative. During his first speech to a party conference in 2006, Cameron had defined this as believing in individual freedom and human rights, but being skeptical of "grand schemes to remake the world".

Relation to American conservatism 
In the United States, conservatives often combine the economic individualism of classical liberals with a Burkean form of conservatism that emphasizes the natural inequalities between men, the irrationality of human behavior as the basis for the human drive for order and stability and the rejection of natural rights as the basis for government. From a different perspective, American conservatism (a "hybrid of conservatism and classical liberalism") has exalted three tenets of Burkean conservatism, namely the diffidence toward the power of the state, the preference of liberty over equality and for patriotism while rejecting the three remaining tenets, namely loyalty to traditional institutions and hierarchies, scepticism regarding progress and elitism. Consequently, the term liberal conservatism is not used in the United States. Modern American liberalism happens to be quite different from European liberalism and occupies the centre-left of the political spectrum, in contrast to many European countries where liberalism is often more associated with the centre and centre-right while social democracy makes up a substantial part of the centre-left. The opposite is true in Latin America, where economically liberal conservatism is often labelled under the rubric of neoliberalism both in popular culture and academic discourse.

American libertarian conservatism focuses more on libertarian economic principles and conservative cultural principles, but social stances of European liberal conservatism, on the other hand, are more closely related to relative progressivism than traditional conservatism. American neoconservatism is sometimes described as the same or similar to liberal conservatism in Europe. However, Peter Lawler regarded neoconservatism in the United States as conservative liberalism and distinguished it from liberal conservatism. Fiscal conservatism is also an idea rooted in classical liberalism.

Classical conservatism and economic liberalism 

Historically, conservatism in the 18th and 19th centuries comprised a set of principles based on concern for established tradition, respect for authority and religious values. This form of traditionalist or classical conservatism is often considered to be exemplified by the writings of Joseph de Maistre in the post-Enlightenment age. Contemporaneous liberalism, now recalled as classical liberalism, advocated both political freedom for individuals and a free market in the economic sphere. Ideas of this sort were promulgated by John Locke, Montesquieu, Voltaire, Jean-Jacques Rousseau, Ben Franklin, Thomas Jefferson, Thomas Paine, Edward Gibbon, David Hume, Adam Smith, Jeremy Bentham and John Stuart Mill, who are respectively remembered as the fathers of liberalism, including economic liberalism, the separation of church and state, social liberalism and utilitarianism.

According to scholar Andrew Vincent, the maxim of liberal conservatism is "economics is prior to politics". Others emphasize the openness of historical change and a suspicion of tyrannical majorities behind the hailing of individual liberties and traditional virtues by authors such as Edmund Burke and Alexis de Tocqueville as the basis of current liberal conservatism which can be seen both in the works of Raymond Aron and Michael Oakeshott. However, there is general agreement that the original liberal conservatives were those who combined conservative social attitudes with an economically liberal outlook, adapting a previous aristocratic understanding of natural inequalities between men to the rule of meritocracy, without directly criticizing privileges of birth as long as individual liberties were guaranteed. Over time, the majority of conservatives in the Western world came to adopt free market economic ideas as the Industrial Revolution progressed and the aristocracy lost its power, to the extent that such ideas are now generally considered as part of conservatism. Nonetheless, the term liberal is used in most countries to describe those with free-market economic views. This is the case in continental Europe, Australia and Latin America.

Liberal-conservative parties or parties with liberal-conservative factions

Current parties 

 : Democratic Party of Albania
 : Republican Proposal
 : Liberal Party of Australia
 : Austrian People's Party
 : United Civic Party of Belarus
 : Brazil Union
 : Union of Democratic Forces
 : Conservative Party of Canada
 : National Renewal
 : Civic Democratic Party, TOP 09
: Croatian Democratic Union
: Venstre, Conservative People's Party
: Estonian Reform Party
 : National Coalition Party, Centre Party
 : The Republicans
 : Christian Democratic Union of Germany, Free Democratic Party
 : New Democracy
 : Feeling of Community
 : Independence Party
 : Fine Gael 
 : Likud, New Hope
 : Forza Italia
 : Unity
 : Homeland Union
 : National Action Party
 : Constitutional Union
 : Democratic Party
 : National League for Democracy
 : People's Party for Freedom and Democracy
 : National Party
 : VMRO-DPMNE (Internal Macedonian Revolutionary Organization – Democratic Party for Macedonian National Unity) 
 : Conservative Party
 : Partido Federal ng Pilipinas
 : Agreement, Civic Platform
 : Social Democratic Party
 : National Liberal Party
 : Civic Platform
 : People's Party, Serbian Progressive Party
 : Democrats, NOVA, Civic Conservative Party, Alliance
 : Slovenian Democratic Party
 : People's Party
 : Moderate Party
 : Kuomintang
 : Democrat Party (current)
 : Conservative Party
 : Republican Party
  : National Party

Former parties 

 : Democratic Social Party, Democrats
 : Progressive Conservative Party of Canada
 : Civic Democratic Alliance, Freedom Union – Democratic Union, Realists
: Res Publica Party
 : National Centre of Independents and Peasants, Union for the New Republic, Independent Republicans, Perspectives and Realities Clubs, Union of Democrats for the Republic, Republican Party, Rally for the Republic, Union for French Democracy, Union for a Popular Movement
 : Free Conservative Party
 : Swatantra Party
 : General Zionists
 : Forza Italia, The People of Freedom, Tyrolean Homeland Party, Italian Liberal Party
 : Japan New Party
 : Movement for Changes
 : Conservative People's Party,
 : Democratic Convention of Romania, Democratic Liberal Party
 : G17 Plus
 : Slovak Democratic and Christian Union – Democratic Party
 : Bareunmirae Party
  Democrat Party (historical), Justice and Development Party

Liberal-conservative organisations 

 : Bright Blue
 : Everybody's Hungary Movement

See also 

 List of conservative parties by country
 Conservative liberalism
 Neoliberalism
 Neoconservatism
 Progressive conservatism
 Conservatism in the United States
 Fiscal conservatism
 Neoconservatism
 Thatcherism

Citations

General references 
 	
 
 
 
 
 

 
Conservatism
Liberalism
Classical liberalism
Centre-right ideologies
Conservatism in the United States
Conservative liberalism
Right-wing ideologies
Political theories
Social theories